The 1926 European Rowing Championships were rowing championships held on Lake Lucerne in the Swiss city of Lucerne. The competition was for men only and they competed in all seven Olympic boat classes (M1x, M2x, M2-, M2+, M4-, M4+, M8+).

Competition
The regatta was held on Lake Lucerne; the 1908 European Rowing Championships had also been held there. From 1933 onwards, the nearby Rotsee was used for regattas instead. The final race day in 1926 was Monday, 6 September. The Italian eight was from Canottieri Bucintoro in Venice.

Medal summary

Footnotes

References

European Rowing Championships
Rowing
Sport in Lucerne
European Rowing Championships
Rowing
European Rowing Championships